The Queensland Open  originally called the Queensland Championships  and also known as the Queensland Lawn Tennis Championships  and the Queensland State Championships was a tennis tournament played in Brisbane, Australia, from 1888 to 1994. The event was part of the Grand Prix tennis circuit and WTA Tour and was played originally on outdoor grass courts then outdoor and indoor hard courts.

History
The Queensland State Championships were first played on grass until 1969. The Queensland Open continued on grass courts until 1982 between 1987 and 1988 it switched to indoor hard courts from 1989 to 1991 it was then played on outdoor hard courts before returning to indoor hard courts until the tournament ceased. The tournament was hosted at various venues over the course of its history first at the Toowong Sports Ground (1888, 1891–1893), the Breakfast Creek Sports Ground (1889–1890), the Brisbane Exhibition Grounds (1894–1896), the Woolloongabba Cricket Ground Cricket (1897,99 1900–04, 1907–08), the Auchenflower Ground (1904–1915) before settling in a permanent base at the Milton Courts tennis centre from (1919–1994). The tournament featured men's and women's singles and doubles competition as well as mixed doubles events the tournament survived for a period of 106 years, the tennis center was closed in 1997 due to heavy financial losses by Tennis Queensland.

Champions

Men's singles
Notes: * The 1923 edition of the men's singles event was combined with the 1923 Australasian Championships.

Men's doubles

Women's singles
Notes: * The 1923 edition of the women's singles event was combined with the 1923 Australasian Championships.

References

Notes

 Ayre's Lawn Tennis Almanack and Tournament Guide, 1908 to 1938, A. Wallis Myers. 
 British Lawn Tennis and Squash Magazine, 1948 to 1967, British Lawn Tennis Ltd, UK.
 Dunlop Lawn Tennis Almanack And Tournament Guide, G.P. Hughes, 1939 to 1958, Dunlop Sports Co. Ltd, UK
 Lawn tennis and Badminton Magazine, 1906 to 1973,  UK.
 Lowe's Lawn Tennis Annuals and Compendia, Lowe, Sir F. Gordon, Eyre & Spottiswoode
 Spalding's Lawn Tennis Annuals from 1885 to 1922, American Sports Pub. Co, USA.
 The World of Tennis Annuals, Barrett John, 1970 to 2001.

External links
http://www.tennisarchives.com/Queensland Championships Men's Singles Roll of Honour
https://app.thetennisbase.com/Queensland Championships/Open Men's Singles Roll of Honour
ITF Vault

ATP Tour
Grand Prix tennis circuit
Grass court tennis tournaments
Hard court tennis tournaments
Indoor tennis tournaments
Sport in Brisbane
Defunct tennis tournaments in Australia